(English: 'Vacations of Terror') is a 1989 cult Mexican horror film starring Julio Alemán, Pedro Fernández and Gabriela Hassel. It was directed by Rene Cardona III and the film main plot follows a wealthy family during a weekend trip to a vacation house only to be haunted by the spirit of an evil witch who was executed there many years ago.

The film became a cult classic in Mexican horror film history mainly for its lead actor Pedro Fernandez and its villain the haunted doll. It was succeeded by a sequel: Vacations of Terror 2. A remake of the film is planned.

Plot 
In 1889, a mob led by an inquisitor ambush and set ablaze a powerful witch whose powers are nullified by a sacred amulet; however, she swears revenge for her trial and subsequent execution. One hundred years later in 1989, a young man named Julio trades his music player with a peasant for the same amulet. He is an aficionado of occultism, and when he tells his wealthy girlfriend Paulina, she convinces him to join her family trip to a recently inherited vacation house by her uncle in Valle de Bravo, Mexico. 

They arrive at the vacation house. Paulina's family – her uncle Fernando, his pregnant wife Lorena, and their children Gaby, and twins Jaime and Pedro – try to spend the weekend at the house, even though all of them except for Paulina and Fernando feel the house is ugly and unnerving. After Julio arrives, some strange phenomena occur like eggs exploding, the electrical system suddenly improves, and Gaby has hallucinations and nightmares of the witch trial. Next day while the children play around the house, Gaby falls in a pit where the witch's belongings were hidden. There she finds and is drawn by a disturbing doll that she keeps as a new toy. 

During an argument with Gaby about her new doll, Lorena suffers pregnancy complications, forcing Fernando to take her to the closest hospital and leaving Paulina and Julio in charge of the children. Gaby then acts menacingly and strangely, claiming the doll talks to her and that it is somehow able to create paranormal phenomena, like hallucinations and object manipulations. As Fernando and Lorena are gone longer than expected, Paulina and Julio do their best to keep the children safe. However, the doll takes over Gaby's body and attacks both teenagers, exposing its true nature. Meanwhile at the hospital, Lorena warns her husband that their children are in danger and begs him to go rescue them. 

Julio tries to use the amulet against the doll, but he is trapped inside a mirror. Gaby, under the doll's influence, tries to kill her cousin and her own father. However, Paulina uses the amulet on the doll and throws it into a fireplace, which causes a fire and breaks Julio free, who helps one of the twins escape the house and narrowly escapes. Sometime later the house is put up for sale and while it is visited by an interested family, the family's eldest daughter finds the haunted doll intact, implying that what happened to Gaby and her family could be repeated.

Cast

Reception

 received acclaim from the public for its plot and effects; it later became a cult film in Mexican cinema mainly for being a pioneer in the genres of supernatural horror and possessions of inanimate objects. On the other hand, its premiere received a lukewarm reception from specialized critics, which has gradually changed: it is now considered a classic element of Mexican cinema.

References

External links
 

1989 films
1989 horror films
1989 drama films
Mexican horror films
Mexican drama films
1980s Spanish-language films
Haunted house films
Films about time travel
Films about vacationing
1980s Mexican films